The Preston River is a river in the South West region of Western Australia.

The majority of the river catchment has been cleared for agriculture although some remnant forest vegetation exists at the headwaters.

The towns of Donnybrook and Boyanup are on the shores of the Preston River. 

The major tributaries of the river include the Ferguson River and Joshua Creek. Minor tributaries include Thomson Brook, Crooked Brook, Charley Creek, Waterfall Gully, Mininup Brook, Millbrook and Gavin Guly. The Glen Mervyn Dam is along the Preston River.

The river basin is monitored routinely as a result of eutrophication problems within the Leschenault Inlet. The water quality is fresh in many places and generally low in nutrients although some areas are slightly enriched with nitrogen.

References 

Rivers of the South West region
Swan Coastal Plain